Ctenopharynx is a small genus of haplochromine cichlids from East Africa. Two of its species are endemic to Lake Malawi, while the third occurs in Lake Malawi and the upper reaches of the Shire River.

Species
There are currently three recognized species in this genus:
 Ctenopharynx intermedius (Günther, 1864) (Blackspot Climbing Perch)
 Ctenopharynx nitidus (Trewavas, 1935)
 Ctenopharynx pictus (Trewavas, 1935)

References

 
Haplochromini
 
Cichlid genera
Taxa named by David Henry Eccles
Taxa named by Ethelwynn Trewavas